Lihué Calel National Park  (Mapudungun Lihue = "life" and Calel "mountainous area", "mountains of life") is a national park in Argentina, located in the Lihue Calel Department, in the center of La Pampa Province. The area is one of mountain plains and plateaux, and is known for its grass tussocks.  The park covers 324 square kilometres, and was established in 1977.

External links

National parks of Argentina
Protected areas established in 1977
Protected areas of La Pampa Province